Liberia is a country in Africa.

Liberia may also refer to:

 Liberia, Costa Rica
 Liberia (canton)
 Liberia (cycling team)
 Liberia (Manassas, Virginia)
 The African Repository, later titled Liberia in 1892